Dominic Archie Bernard (born 29 March 1997) is a professional footballer who plays as a defender for  club Forest Green Rovers.

Bernard began his football career with Birmingham City. He made his senior debut while on loan to Aldershot Town of the National League in 2018–19, and was released at the end of that season without having played senior football for Birmingham. He signed for Forest Green Rovers in July 2019.

Bernard was born in Gloucester, England, and has represented the Republic of Ireland internationally at under-17 and under-18 levels.

Club career

Early life and club career
Bernard was born in Gloucester. and attended Upton St Leonards primary school. He represented Gloucestershire Schools at football at primary school level, as well as playing for local team Tredworth Tigers, before joining Birmingham's Academy at the age of 12. He took up a scholarship with the club in July 2013. By 2014–15 pre-season, he was captain of the under-18 team.

Birmingham City
Bernard played in the Birmingham team, a mixture of first-team and reserve players, that won the 2014–15 Birmingham Senior Cup, and signed his first professional contract, of two years, a few days later. According to coach Steve Spooner, "Dom is your thinking man's footballer. He is very calm and composed on the ball and seldom goes to ground. He sees things quickly and his reading of the game is excellent." He was a member of the Birmingham reserve team that lost the 2016 Birmingham Senior Cup final to National League North champions Solihull Moors. He was one of three youngstersthe others were Josh Dacres-Cogley and Wes Hardingwho began their pre-season training with the first team, but suffered an Achilles injury that kept him out for most of the 2016–17 season.

The club took up the one-year option on Bernard's contract for the 2017–18 season, and offered him a further year for 2018–19. Initially a member of the U23 squad for pre-season training in Austria, Bernard was called into the senior party, and on their return to England, he played in several first-team friendlies. He then joined Aldershot Town of the National League on a six-month loan. He became a regular in the side, and his loan was extended to the end of the season. He won the club's Player of the Month award for January 2019, and finished the season with 37 appearances in all competitions.

In March 2019, Birmingham confirmed that Bernard would be released when his contract expired at the end of the season.

Forest Green Rovers
After taking part in pre-season training with Forest Green Rovers, Bernard signed a one-year contract with the League Two club on 17 July 2019. He made his debut on the opening day of the 2019–20 season, in the starting eleven for the match at home to Oldham Athletic. He soon established himself as a regular in the starting eleven, playing on the right of the defence in a variety of formations, and in early November, his contract was extended to run until 2021.

International career
Bernard was first called up to the Republic of Ireland under-17 squad for two friendly matches against Slovakia in September 2013. He started the first and came on for the last few minutes of the second, both of which were defeats. He played for the under-18s once in June 2015, but was injured when under consideration for the under-19s a few months later.

Career statistics

Honours
Forest Green Rovers
League Two: 2021–22

References

1997 births
Living people
Footballers from Gloucester
English footballers
Republic of Ireland association footballers
Republic of Ireland youth international footballers
Association football defenders
Birmingham City F.C. players
Aldershot Town F.C. players
Forest Green Rovers F.C. players
National League (English football) players
English Football League players